Merouane Kial (born March 5, 1972 in Tixter) is an Algerian former football player.

Club career
Kial spent the first 17 seasons of his professional career with CA Bordj Bou Arréridj. On July 26, 2010, he left the club and signed a two year contract with MC Saïda, joining them on a free transfer.
In 2012, Kial signed two year contract with MO Constantine.

After retiring he has worked as a coach.

Honours
 Finalist of the Algerian Cup once with CA Bordj Bou Arréridj in 2009

References

External links
 DZFoot Profile
 

1972 births
Living people
People from Tixter
Algerian footballers
Algerian Ligue Professionnelle 1 players
CA Bordj Bou Arréridj players
MC Saïda players
MO Constantine players
Association football goalkeepers
Association football goalkeeping coaches
21st-century Algerian people